The Bosnia and Herzegovina women's national ice hockey team is the women's national ice hockey team of Bosnia and Herzegovina. The team is controlled by the Bosnia and Herzegovina Ice Hockey Federation, a member of the International Ice Hockey Federation.

History
The team first played in an international tournament at the 2022 IIHF Women's World Championship Division III, the lowest IIHF women's hockey tier.

World Championship record
2022 – Finished in 37th place (3nd in Division IIIB)

References

External links
Official website
IIHF profile
National Teams of Ice Hockey

Ice hockey
Women's national ice hockey teams in Europe